Mike Johnson (born 1952) is an American experimental rock guitarist and composer, best known as the co-founder and member of the Denver-based avant-rock group Thinking Plague. He has also been a member of Hamster Theatre and The Science Group, and has collaborated with several musicians, including Bob Drake, Susanne Lewis and Janet Feder.

Biography
Mike Johnson played in his first band at the age of 13 and began writing music at 17. He studied classical and electronic music in college in Denver but taught himself the guitar and composition. While at college in 1978 Johnson answered an advertisement at a local music store requesting a guitar player "into Henry Cow, Yes…" This put him in touch with bass guitarist and drummer Bob Drake. Johnson and Drake initially played in a few cover bands but in 1980 they began experimenting with prepared guitars and tape machines, and recording material Johnson had written. "Our goal was to combine the harder edge of progressive rock, as in Crimson and Yes, with the more modern tonalities and experimental approach as reflected in the work of the Art Bears, our major heroes at the time." By 1982 they had enough material to perform live and enlisted three other musicians for a brief tour of Denver. This band became the first incarnation of Thinking Plague.

Thinking Plague

Thinking Plague was active on and off between 1982 and 2004 and quickly achieved prominence in avant-rock circles. They made five studio albums, and released one live album recorded at NEARfest in 2000. Johnson and Drake led the group until Drake left in the early 1990s after which Johnson took the helm. Most of Thinking Plague's material was composed by Johnson.

Other bands and collaborations
While Thinking Plague has dominated most of Johnson's musical career, he has also been a member of Hamster Theatre since 1996 and The Science Group in 2003. He toured with the 5uu's and Hail in the mid-1990s and has collaborated with a number of musicians, including Bob Drake, Susanne Lewis, Janet Feder and Fred Frith.

Discography
With Thinking Plague
...A Thinking Plague (1984, LP, Endemic Music, US)
Moonsongs (1987, LP, Dead Man's Curve Records, UK)
Driving Me Backwards (compilation) (1987, LP, Dead Man's Curve Records, UK)
In This Life (1989, CD, Recommended Records ReR, UK)
RēR Records Quarterly Vol.2 No.4 (1989, LP, Recommended Records, UK)
RēR Quarterly Vol.4 No.1 (1994, CD, Recommended Records, UK)
In Extremis (1998, CD, Cuneiform Records, US)
A History of Madness (2003, CD, Cuneiform Records, US)
Upon Both Your Houses (live at NEARfest 2000) (2004, CD, NEARfest Records, US)
Decline and Fall (2012, CD, Cuneiform Records, US)
Hoping Against Hope (2017, CD, Cuneiform Records, US)
With Hamster Theatre
Siege on Hamburger City (1998, CD, Cricetus, US)
Carnival Detournement (2001, CD, Cuneiform Records, US)
The Public Execution of Mr. Personality / Quasi Dayroom (2006, CD, Cuneiform Records, US) (partially recorded at Progman Cometh)
With Hail
Turn of the Screw (1990, CD, Cuneiform Records, US)
With Janet Feder
Speak Puppet (2001, CD, Recommended Records ReR, US)
With Fred Frith
Prints (2002, CD, Recommended Records ReR, UK)
With The Science Group
Spoors (2003, CD, Recommended Records ReR, UK)
With Luciano Margorani
My Favorite Strings (2004, CD, Isinaz, Italy)
With David Shamrock
Thin Pillow (2004, CD, Pillowsounds, US)
With Yugen
Iridule (2010, CD, AltrOck, Italy)
With Dave Willey
Immeasurable Currents (2011, CD, AltrOck, Italy)

See also
Romantic Warriors II: A Progressive Music Saga About Rock in Opposition
Romantic Warriors II: Special Features DVD

References

External links
Mike Johnson biography. Thinking Plague homepage.
.
Interview with Mike Johnson, May 2001. The Giant Progweed; .
Interview with Mike Johnson, November 2004. Progressive Ears.

1952 births
Living people
American experimental guitarists
American male guitarists
American male composers
20th-century American composers
American rock guitarists
Musicians from Denver
Date of birth missing (living people)
Place of birth missing (living people)
Guitarists from Colorado
20th-century American guitarists
21st-century American guitarists
Cuneiform Records artists
20th-century American male musicians
21st-century American male musicians